Nicholas County Schools is a school district serving Nicholas County, West Virginia. Its main office is in Summersville, West Virginia

Board of Education
Nicholas County Schools is under the direction of the Nicholas County Board of Education, made up of the following members:

Chip Perrine, President
Roy Moose, Vice President
Phil Berry
Dr. Gus Penix
Rick Green

Schools

High schools
Nicholas County High School, Summersville
 Richwood High School, Richwood

Middle schools
Summersville Middle School, Summersville
Richwood Middle School, Richwood

Elementary schools
Birch River Elementary, Birch River
Cherry River Elementary, Richwood
Gauley River Elementary, Craigsville
Glade Creek Elementary, Summersville
Mount Lookout Elementary, Mount Lookout
Mount Nebo Elementary, Mount Nebo
Panther Creek Elementary, Nettie
Summersville Elementary School, Summersville
Zela Elementary School, Zela

Vocational Schools
Nicholas County Career and Technical Center, Craigsville

Alternative schools
Nicholas County Learning Center and Cadet Leadership Academy, Summersville

Former Schools
Beaver Elementary School
Craigsville Elementary School
Dixie Elementary School
Summersville Junior High School
Richwood Junior High School

References

External links
Official Website

School districts in West Virginia
Education in Nicholas County, West Virginia